is a Japanese manga series written and illustrated by Takahiro Arai.

Plot
The story centers around twin brothers, Arago and Ewan, whose parents were slaughtered by a monster. Years later, as blood begins to flow again in the streets of London, the vengeful Arago crosses paths with Ewan, who has since become a police officer, just as blood begins to flow again in the streets of London.

Characters
 Arago Hunt is the main protagonist in the AR∀GO manga series. His father, Doug Hunt, and his unnamed mother were slaughtered by Patchman when Arago was young. Arago parted with his twin brother, Ewan, to find Patchman and seek revenge. He returned to the streets of London after hearing rumours of the serial killer. Arago and his brother tried to capture him but even their combined attempts failed resulting in Ewan becoming fatally wounded and finally, dying. After defeating Patchman and avenging his parents' death, Arago gained mysterious powers along with his departed brother's arm. Succeeding his older brother's will, Arago became a police officer and has been selected for the Criminal Investigation Department (CID). 
 Ewan Hunt is Arago's twin brother and one of the main characters in the first chapters. He seeks revenge and indirectly looks for Patchman while becoming an elite cop; unlike Arago who directly searches for Patchman. However, in a meeting with his brother after so long in an attempt to capture Patchman, he gets fatally wounded and died. However, he was resurrected along with Patchman, still retaining some of his mentality as he told Arago to run away. 
 Rio Butler is a childhood friend of Arago and Ewan but was forced to transfer to Japan, where her mother was born, due to some circumstances of her father's job. After 15 years, she returns to London only to find out that Ewan is dead and Arago has become a detective, trying to follow his brother's steps. Frustrated at first, she keeps a distant to Arago as she is not in favor of his decision of becoming a detective, and also feeling despondent because she was in love with Ewan. However, after the ghost bus incident, Rio's behavior towards him changes and she becomes more friendly. She is one of Arago's closest companions, despite being kept out of the supernatural world. However, recently, Arago told everything that he knows; from his Brionac ability to Ewan's resurrection. 
 Joe Sullivan is the skirt-chasing assistant inspector from the detective department and one of the main characters in the ARAGO series. It seems that Joe has a high opinion about Arago, and as a result recommended him to join the CID. However, he always disappeared into his secret investigation room in the Grey Museum. It is later revealed that Coco is in fact Joe's adopted daughter. (SPOILERS) In Chapter 83 he sacrifices his life to save Arago when his brother Ewan (Patchman) tries to kill Arago. 
 Seth Stringer (also known as Orc Of Oppression and Revolution) makes his first appearance in chapter 9 where he is being bullied by other high schoolers. As an avid fan of William Blake, a poet, painter, and printmaker of the 18th century, he is often seen with his book or quoting pieces by William Blake. At his first appearance, Seth was believed to be acting under the orders of Professor Eames, supposedly the leader of a cult, but instead Seth revealed himself to be the one who was controlling Eames all along. Seth is a contractor of Orc who uses a weapon called Sluagh Ghairm which takes the form of a horn that allows him to control the expansion and contraction of the air including spatial interference. He is a teenager who made an agreement with the devil to obtain his power and to fight with Arago. His ultimate goal and his reason for needing the Brionac (despite the fact that he can't hold its power) is unclear, however he did said "in order to eliminate the people and the system that have built this world of deception and lies" during his first fight with The White Horseman. In chapter 80, he readily sacrifice himself and his Seed to switch place with Arago in the Lia Fáil. Due to the Lia Fáil ability, he may or may not be dead. 
 Coco- is daughter of rupert and adopted daughter of joe.
 Oswell 'Oz' Miller is a member of the Queen's Special Forces, "Albion", the Sacred Guardian Corps. It was revealed that he is the last remaining Albion (the others were killed by Patchman) and his mission is to protect the world's last hope; the Brionac's seed holder, Arago. He was presumably dead in chapter 73 after an intense battle with the red horseman; one which he was forced to use the Claiomh Solais' seed (a person without resistance can't accept the seed's power and will eventually die). However, through an unknown mean, he is still alive and he is capable of depositing the seed out of his body. 
 Lucian Gardner is one of the Four Horsemen who follow Patchman's order. He represents the Pale Horseman, which symbolizes death. He may be French, as he uses various French words when talking. As he symbolizes death, he always appears with his demonic dog (composed of his shadows) appropriately named Hades, the king of the underworld and the god of death. He first appears confronting Seth in chapter 20. 
 Scarlet Rabi is one of the four horsemen that follows the order of Patchman. Scarlet holds the title of the Red Horseman, which symbolizes war. She was to obtain the Claiomh Solais, but failed as she retreated after a battle with Oz, in which she loses the Claiomh Solais' seed to him. She first appeared walking towards the estate of Duke Macdonell in chapter 55. In chapter 73: although appearing victorious at first, she was killed by Oz; who used the Claiomh Solais' seed on himself who impaled her with the unicorn horn. 
 Hugh Weissman is one of the Four Horsemen who follow Patchman. Hugh is the White Horseman, who symbolizes conquest, and is first seen looking for Lia Fáil in chapter 48. He was later killed by Seth in chapter 71, after a battle which destroy many parts of London as well as Seth's body. 
 Dr. Simon Cloteaux is one of the Four Horsemen who follow Patchman. Simon is the Black Horseman, who symbolizes famine. He works as a doctor and introduces himself to Arago and Coco as a police consultant. Simon has his own expensive clinic, where he treats upper-class people. He also helps illegal immigrants, however it is revealed that this is just a camouflage for getting a limitless amount of corpses. He first appeared in chapter 38 in which he successfully (through unknown method at time) captures one of the gremlin in the factory. Even after fusing his body with various Gogmagog, he was killed by the combined strength of 'wolf-woman' Rio, Coco and Joe. 
 Patchman is the main antagonist of the series. He possesses the power Brionac and is the one responsible for Arago's parents' death and, subsequently, his brother Ewan's as well. After Patchman's death, Arago gained his power for unknown reasons. It is later revealed that Patchman had been revived.

External links
 The information for Volume 1.
 Review for Volume 1.
 News Item.
 Review for Volume 2.

Manga series
Shōnen manga